Wendy Schaal (born July 2, 1954) is an American actress known for her work in Joe Dante films such as Innerspace, The 'Burbs, and Small Soldiers. Her other film credits include starring in films such as Where the Boys Are '84, Creature, Going Under, and Munchies. She had many guest roles in television series of the mid-1980s, most notably as Marilyn Kelsy in Airwolf. Since 2005 she has primarily worked in voice acting, most notably voicing Francine Smith in the animated comedy television series American Dad!

Early years 
Schaal was born in Chicago, Illinois, the daughter of Lois Schaal ( Treacy) and actor Richard Schaal. Schall's father was married to actress Valerie Harper from 1964 to 1978, making Harper her stepmother. From birth until she was five, Schaal lived with her parents in Crete, Illinois, at which time she moved with her mother to Newport Beach, California after her parents divorced. Schaal studied acting with Viola Spolin in Chicago when she was nine years old, later moving to Wisconsin and then California when she was 11. When she was 14, a trip to New York to be with her father and Harper soon led her to California again when her father and stepmother chose to settle in Hollywood.

Schaal earned an Associate of Arts degree from Los Angeles City College, acting and working in set construction. After she attended an acting workshop led by her father, she began to work on television.

Career
Schaal's early work on television included roles on Fish, Little House on the Prairie, Phyllis, Rhoda, and Welcome Back, Kotter. In 1981, Schaal joined the cast of the ABC-TV series Fantasy Island, portraying Julie, the niece of the program's central character, Mr. Roarke. Her other roles on TV included Bonnie Hornback in AfterMASH, Debbie Pepper in Good Grief, Vickie Allen in It's a Living, and Liz Dooley in Nearly Departed. She also provides the voice of Francine Smith in the cartoon series American Dad!

Personal life
Schaal was married to Stephen M. Schwartz on September 4, 1977, but divorced in October 1987. They have one son.

Filmography

References

External links

1954 births
Actresses from Chicago
American film actresses
American television actresses
American voice actresses
Jewish American actresses
Living people
20th-century American actresses
21st-century American actresses
20th-century American Jews
21st-century American Jews